Ernest P. Worrell is a fictional character that was portrayed by American actor Jim Varney in a series of television commercials and then later in a television series (Hey Vern, It's Ernest!) and a series of feature films. 

Ernest — created by Varney with the Nashville advertising agency Carden & Cherry — was used in various local television ad campaigns. The only national products the character promoted were The Coca-Cola Company's sodas, Chex cereals, and Taco John's.  The first Ernest commercial, filmed in 1980, advertised an appearance by the Dallas Cowboys Cheerleaders at Beech Bend Park, an amusement park near Bowling Green, Kentucky. 

The format of the Ernest commercials seldom varied, most often scripted to be comedic and fast-paced. The rubber-faced Ernest, almost always dressed in a denim vest and a  baseball cap, appeared at the door or window of an unseen, unheard, and seemingly unwilling neighbor named Vernon, or "Vern" for short. The spots were structured in a way to allow the viewer to be "Vern", as Varney looked directly into the camera whenever Earnest addressed Vern. Ernest's seemingly pointless conversations with Vern – which were actually a monologue due to Vern's never responding – inevitably rambled around to a favorable description of the sponsor's product, followed by Ernest's signature close, "KnowhutImean?"

While Vern never has any spoken lines, it is implied that he finds Ernest to be an unwelcome pest as evidenced by Vern's  occasionally trying to slam his door or window in Ernest's face. Vern also shakes his head "No" (quick, short camera pans) whenever Ernest invites him to do something. Ernest, despite having good intentions, is utterly oblivious to Vern's apparent distress about Ernest and about Ernest's regarding Vern as his closest buddy and confidant.

History
The Ernest ads were shot with a handheld film camera at the Nashville-area home of producer John Cherry III and Jerry Carden, beginning in 1980. As their number of clients increased, Varney sometimes did upwards of 25 different versions of a spot in a single day. Producer Coke Sams stated that Varney had a photographic memory and would read through the script one time then insert the various products' names on different takes. The commercials and the character had definite impact; children, especially, seemed to imitate Ernest and, "Knowwhatimean?", became a catchphrase.

Carden & Cherry had begun receiving requests from major national companies to use Ernest, but were largely unable to agree to most of them because of conflicts with the exclusive rights local companies received when they had requested Ernest commercials. Carden & Cherry responded by transitioning the character to film and television. Ernest's first feature-film appearance was as one of Varney's numerous characters in the science fiction horror spoof Dr. Otto and the Riddle of the Gloom Beam, which introduced several supporting actors who would reappear throughout the Ernest franchise, including Bill Byrge, Myke R. Mueller, and Jackie Welch.

A Saturday morning sketch comedy series, Hey Vern, It's Ernest!, followed shortly thereafter, which won Varney a Daytime Emmy Award for his performance. A series of five feature-length comedies starred Ernest between 1987 and 1993, followed by four more direct-to-video entries; all nine were directed by either John Cherry or Coke Sams. The movies were not critically well-received; however, they were produced on very low budgets and were quite profitable.

In the films, Ernest is apparently somewhat aware of his extreme resistance to harm, as in Ernest Rides Again, he seemed barely fazed by nails bending after being fired at his skull, remarking "Good thing they hit the hard end", he also commented that he would be dead "If I wasn't this close to being an actual cartoon." To allow Varney to act out his numerous other characters, Ernest is portrayed as a master of disguise, able to pose as one of any number of relatives to get out of a predicament. He also is impervious to electrocution, instead becoming a powerful electromagnet and "polarized" from gravity (among other surreal side effects) when hit with a large shock: this is a major plot device in Ernest Goes to Jail and also appears in Ernest Rides Again (though the superpower disappears by the time of Ernest in the Army). The film series portrays Ernest as a working-class bachelor holding various minimum-wage and blue-collar jobs, such as a gas station attendant, janitor, sanitation worker and construction worker.

In his Ernest role, Varney appeared in dozens of Cerritos Auto Square commercials for many years on Los Angeles area television stations; he also appeared in commercials for Audubon Chrysler Center in Henderson, Kentucky, John L. Sullivan auto dealerships in the Sacramento, California area, the Pontiac, Michigan-based electronics store ABC Warehouse, and the Oklahoma City-based Braum's Ice Cream and Dairy Store. In the Southeast, the Ernest character was the spokesman for Purity milk. In New Mexico, he appeared in commercials for Blake's Lotaburger. In northern Virginia Ernest appeared a series of commercials for Tyson's Toyota. In South Dakota, he appeared in commercials for Lewis Drug.

In Houston, he did commercials promoting Channel 2 News KPRC-TV. In 2005, five years after Varney's death, the Ernest P. Worrell character returned in new commercials as a CGI cartoon, created by an animation company called face2face and produced by Ernest originators Carden & Cherry. Ernest was voiced by John C. Hudgens, an advertising and broadcast producer from Little Rock, Arkansas, who also played an Ernest type character in some regional live action commercials.

Family
Ernest has a large family made up of people with similar traits to him, all of whom were portrayed by Jim Varney. Varney, as Worrell, mentioned that his family was from Kentucky (Varney's real-life birthplace) when he hosted Happy New Year, America on CBS December 31, 1988. Most of Worrell's family members had their appearance in either Hey Vern, It's My Family Album, Your World as I See It, or Varney's stand-up routine.

 Edna Worrell
 Ernest's wife according to the television commercials and Hey Vern, It's My Family Album. According to Ernest, Edna makes a great deep dish pie. Her middle initial is also said to be P. in Ernest's newsletter during the 1980s. In the film series, Ernest has become a confirmed bachelor, living alone with his dog.
 Ace Worrell
 A fighter pilot who served in the army. His relation to Ernest is unknown though he is believed to be a great uncle.
 Astor Clement
 Ernest's uncle, a wealthy college professor who likes to brag about his rich status and unusual intelligence and was the main narrator of Your World As I See It. Astor was also one of Ernest's disguises in Ernest Saves Christmas.
 Bunny Jeannette Rogers
 The slow-witted and confused sister of Ernest who runs her own quirky hair salon called "Bunny's Beauty World." Her beautifying tactics often involve painful torture for her clients.
 Lloyd Rowe
 Ernest's great uncle, a mean-spirited, impoverished Appalachian mountain man. He was Ernest's disguise as "The Snake Guy" in Ernest Saves Christmas. Lloyd was one of Varney's stand-up characters before the creation of Ernest; he was originally conceived as the Appalachian answer to a mountaintop guru with an obese wife named Ruth and an even more massive, indestructible eight-year-old son named Mistake.
 Auntie Nelda
 Ernest's elderly, sarcastic and dramatic great-aunt. She regularly complains about her son Izzy not visiting enough, noting that her other son Hymie had always treated her well but died. Her late husband Morris was cremated and she still harangues his ashes. She tries to get men to notice her by acting innocent all the time. One of Varney's most frequent characters, Auntie Nelda was one of Ernest's "multiple personalities" in Ernest Scared Stupid and one of his disguises in Ernest Saves Christmas, Ernest Goes to Jail, Ernest Rides Again, and Ernest Goes to Africa. Auntie Nelda was also used as one of Dr. Otto's disguises in Dr. Otto and the Riddle of the Gloom Beam and was a regular segment on Hey Vern, It's Ernest!
 Coy Worrell
 Ernest's redneck brother who is stuck in a 1950s rockabilly mindset and runs a store that sells car parts. He is a Bears fan, has virtually no thoughts on any substantive issues (shrugging his shoulders and responding "dunno" whenever asked) is quite proud of the tattoo collection on his body. Coy has been married at least twice: first to Rayette Worrell and then to Anita Worrell.
 Billy "Boogie" Worrell
 Ernest's cousin, a carny who operates the Scrambler at an amusement park, speaks to his patrons in rhyming jive, and dances to a disco beat. While he frequently makes passes at attractive female patrons, he is in fact a married man with a teenage son and speaks with a normal voice outside of work.
 Davy Worrell
 Ernest's light-headed great, great uncle who was a war veteran in the late 19th century. He helped his army troop win a battle against a Native American tribe led by Chief Running Vern, even though his troop was not even present at the time. He is a spoof of frontiersman Davy Crockett.
 Rhetch Worrell
 Ernest's great, great-grandfather who was popular with women and had a girlfriend named Verna. He was a heavy gambler and incredibly stupid.
 Pa Worrell
 Ernest's elderly father, a World War II veteran who has a politically incorrect view of the world. His first name is never revealed. He is an avid fisherman and is friends with an African savage named Qui Qua.
 Ma Worrell
 Ernest's elderly mother. She is known to be a good cook and according to Ernest she used to make a great chocolate milk, which is Ernest's favorite drink.
 Reverend Phineas Worrell
 A distant English-born ancestor of Ernest in "Ernest Scared Stupid". He helped banish a troll named Trantor, who Ernest accidentally released several generations later. Phineas was unique among the known Worrell family in that he appeared to have a relatively serious disposition and appeared to be quite intelligent for the brief moment that he was shown. However, as Trantor was being banished, the troll placed a curse on the Worrell family that would make members of the family considerably less intelligent with each successive generation, ultimately culminating in a member of the family that would release Trantor.
 Dingus Worrell
 A potato, who Ernest says came over during the potato famine and went on to become a yam magnate.

Pets
Ernest also had several pets during the course of his career. They are listed below in order of appearance.

 Shorty
 Ernest's first dog. She appeared in several commercials usually having given birth to a litter of puppies in the back of Vern's new pick up truck while out driving with Ernest. Shorty's exact breed is unknown as she was portrayed by a different breed in each of her appearances. In the Hey Vern, It's Ernest episode "Hey Vern, It's Magic", Shorty was a male and Vern's dog. He was portrayed by a Border Collie on the show.
 Pokey
 A box turtle that Ernest had adopted from "actual nature" in Ernest Goes to Camp. Pokey and his family were used as "turtle paratroopers" during the battle with the miners toward the end of the movie.
 Ants
 In Ernest Goes to Camp, Ernest mentions that he once had an ant farm.
 Rover
 Ernest's second dog. Ernest's pursuit of Rover was the subject of a Hey Vern, It's Ernest! episode. Ernest spent the episode saving up to buy Rover but Vern ended up buying him first only to give him to Ernest at the end.
 Rimshot
 Ernest's third dog, a male Jack Russell Terrier. Rimshot is Ernest's best known pet. He is characterized as very smart. He was featured in two of the movies, Ernest Goes to Jail and Ernest Scared Stupid, in which he was also shown to be very brave and tough, as he would stand up to the main villains which would usually lead to his near demise.
 Jake
 Ernest's Fantail (goldfish) in Ernest Goes to Africa. Sadly, Jake died when Ernest accidentally broke his fish bowl and then dropped him into the kitchen garbage disposal and mistakenly hit the wrong switch.

Specials
 Hey Vern, It's My Family Album (1983) (direct-to-video)
 The Ernest Film Festival (1986) (direct-to-video)
 A compilation of Ernest commercials
 Hey Vern, Win $10,000...Or Just Count On Having Fun! (1987) (direct-to-video)
 A compilation of Ernest commercials, the VHS included a sweepstakes in which viewers who correctly counted the total mentions of the words "Vern" and "Knowhutimean?" in the video and submitted their answer before April 1, 1988 would be entered into a random drawing to win a $10,000 prize.
 Ernest Goes to Splash Mountain (1989) (TV special)
 Ernest's Greatest Hits (1992)
 Two-volume compilation of The Ernest Film Festival and Hey Vern, Win $10,000 with the sweepstakes removed.
 Your World As I See It (1994) (direct-to-video)

Ernest also hosted Happy New Year, America for CBS in the late 1980s; Varney also briefly gave Ernest an appearance on HBO's New Year special (which was co-hosted by Johnny Cash and Kris Kristofferson) heading into 1985. Ernest also appeared in Comic Relief USA for the 1989 season. This show notably featured Vern appearing physically for the first and only time, played by Doug Cox.

Films and television 
 Films
 1985 Dr. Otto and the Riddle of the Gloom Beam as Unnamed Cameo Role, Dr. Otto's Disguise
 1987 Ernest Goes to Camp
 1988 Ernest Saves Christmas
 1990 Ernest Goes to Jail
 1991 Ernest Scared Stupid
 1993 Ernest Rides Again
 1994 Ernest Goes to School 
 1995 Slam Dunk Ernest (direct-to-video) 
 1997 Ernest Goes to Africa (direct-to-video) 
 1998 Ernest in the Army (direct-to-video)

 Television
 1988 Hey Vern, It's Ernest!

Scrapped films
In 1990, seven Ernest films were reported to be in development. Coke Sams said in 2011 that Ernest Spaced Out may have gotten as far as a film treatment. Sams said about the film, "I believe that was kind of a Lost in Space epic. It seems like there were astronauts and maybe a space capsule."

Soon after the release of Ernest Goes to Camp, several more films were being contemplated, including Ernest the Bellhop and Ernest in Paradise.

Sams said a script had been written for Ernest and the Voodoo Curse: "We went back to the Abbott & Costello Meet Frankenstein kind of thing. It had a really bad guy and happened on an island like Hawaii. ... So we had Voodoo and a high priest. It was like the idiot version of Raiders of the Lost Ark. We had lines of zombies, Voodoo potions, and Ernest pretending to be a zombie. Ernest and the Voodoo Curse actually was pretty funny. There was a woman in it, who had one blue eye and one brown eye. She was supposed to be the woman of Ernest's dreams. Of course, she would have nothing to do with him."

By 2003, Jim Varney's IMDb biography page stated that he had died before he could finish filming a tenth Ernest film, titled Ernest the Pirate, which had been stated to be scheduled for release in 2000. In November 2011, Sams said the film never existed. Varney had actually been in consideration for a role in the 1999 film Pirates of the Plain.

Parodies
Ernest has been parodied in numerous television series, including Beavis and Butt-Head, Family Guy and The Simpsons. Some of the "fake" Ernest films from The Simpsons include Ernest Needs a Kidney, Ernest vs. the Pope, Ernest Goes to Broadway, Ernest Goes Straight to Video, and Ernest Goes Somewhere Cheap (footage from Ernest Goes Somewhere Cheap was shown in the episode "Cape Feare", in which Ernest is seen in a public library with Vern and gets his head stuck in a toilet). In the Family Guy episode "Road to Rhode Island", Peter remembers the time he went to Blockbuster two minutes before closing and was forced to choose between Ernest Goes to the Beach and Ernest Doesn't Go to the Beach.

In the Beavis and Butt-Head episode "At the Movies," the boys are watching Ernest at the drive-in. Ernest is inside the Statue of Liberty and comes across a door with a sign that reads "DO NOT ENTER". However, Ernest misreads it as "donut entry" and opens the door, falling through the statue's nose. Other TV shows that have referenced the Ernest movies include ALF, Saved by the Bell, Mystery Science Theater 3000, Kenan & Kel, The Nanny, How I Met Your Mother, The Big Bang Theory, Teen Titans Go, Paradise PD, and many more.

He has recently been spoofed by Arkansas-based spokesman John Lee in television commercials for Englert Leaf Guard gutters.

Commercials on home video
Most of Ernest's commercials were released on VHS tapes, and are also available on DVD from Mill Creek Entertainment and Image Entertainment.

Merchandise
A comedic paperback book titled Hey, Vern! It's the Ernest P. Worrell Book of Knowledge was published by Carden & Cherry in 1985, which was re-released with the title It's the Ernest P. Worrell Book of Knawledge  in 1986. It was followed by the book Ask Ernest: What, When, Where, Why, Who Cares?, published by Rutledge Hill Press in 1993. Both books were designed as if Ernest had created his own homemade zine, featuring a varied collection of jokes, puns, musings, and art.

A  Ernest talking doll based on the TV series Hey Vern, It's Ernest! was produced by Kenner in 1989.

Reboot
In October 2012, a film reboot was announced, tentatively titled Son of Ernest. As suggested by the title the film will focus on Ernest's long lost son, presumably Ernie P. Worrell as mentioned above. No update has been given ever since.

Legacy
In 2017 Tennessee resident and Varney fan Phil Baker launched an annual "Ernest Day" at Montgomery Bell State Park in Middle Tennessee, one of the filming locations of Ernest Goes to Camp.

References

Mascots introduced in 1980
Television characters introduced in 1980
Advertising characters
Comedy television characters
Comedy film characters
Male characters in advertising
Male characters in film
Male characters in television